My Unorthodox Life is an American reality television series by Netflix that premiered on July 14, 2021. The series centers on Julia Haart, the former CEO of a modeling agency and fashion company and a former ultra-Orthodox Jew, as Haart and her family acculturate to their new non-religious lifestyle in Manhattan. The second season premiered on December 2, 2022.

Plot
The nine-episode web series documents Haart and her children's decision to leave the Haredi Jewish community in Monsey, New York, and pursue their passions for fashion and design. Haart claims that she had left Haredi Judaism over her discomfort with the community's strict religious observances and principles that she views as a form of "fundamentalism". Haart is depicted in the show as completing an autobiographical work recounting her personal journey. Haart's forthcoming memoir is titled, Brazen: My Unorthodox Journey from Long Sleeves to Lingerie.

The show features Haart's four children, Batsheva, Shlomo, Miriam, and Aron; her second husband, Italian entrepreneur Silvio Scaglia Haart; and her best friend and chief operating officer of Elite Model World, Robert Brotherton.

Episodes

Season 2 (2022)

Reception

Critical response
Writing for the Decider, Joel Keller recommends the show, writing that it is "going to ride on Julia Haart's personality, and this force of nature has personality to spare". Jenny Singer, in Glamour, called the series "wildly compelling", and wrote that "Haart's anger at her upbringing is justifiable", while also critiquing the show for what she claims will "make life dangerous for Jewish people", by "making a reality show that depicts them as monsters". Irene Katz Connelly, in The Forward, writes that the show is "full of clothing choices, but those who don't choose correctly get chastised", and notes that the show "barely touches on the intriguing logistics of Haart's fashion world ascent". Judy Berman also panned the show, writing in Time that "it's hard to tell which parts of the show have been massaged into ads for Elite, Batsheva's career as an influencer, or Julia's forthcoming memoir". In J.: The Jewish News of Northern California, writer Esther D. Kustanowitz noted: "There's an interesting core story: Julia's goal to liberate and empower people in a way that she thinks allows them to be the most authentic and free versions of themselves... [Haart] wants others to experience freedom the way she defines it... While I can appreciate her embrace of a world she was denied, the imposition of her 'freedom' on others struck me as its own version of oppression." In The Jerusalem Post, Elliot Cohen writes that he "found that Ilhan Omar's infamous anti-Semitic quote, 'all about the Benjamins, baby', has been turned into an evening of Netflix and chill", and that "Netflix and Jeff Jenkins gave anti-Semites their greatest media gift since The Protocols of the Elders of Zion".

Response from Orthodox Jewish community
Articles published in Orthodox media outlets were heavily critical of the perceived anti-Orthodox premises of the show. Many women turned to social media to post pro-Orthodox stories using the hashtag #MyOrthodoxLife, and to express opposition to the show as distorting their position in the Orthodox community. Author Roberta Rosenthal Kwall wrote in Jewish Journal: "Most people outside of Orthodox communities do not understand that Orthodoxy in general is far from monolithic", and the show omits how "Orthodox women are often highly educated and professionally accomplished even in the world of Jewish law, long a male-dominated field". Writing a review in the Washington Jewish Week, writer Andy Gottlieb stated that the show is vapid, and the characters are narcissistic. Rabbi Yair Hoffman, writing in the Five Towns Jewish Times, said that the show is "spewing a vicious form of hatred designed to cast observant Jewry in a hideously negative light".

See also

 Unorthodox (2020 miniseries) 
 One of Us (2017 documentary)
 Leaving the Fold
 Let There Be Light

References

External links
 
 

2021 American television series debuts
2020s American reality television series
English-language Netflix original programming
American religious television series
Television series about Jews and Judaism
Television shows set in Manhattan
Anti-Orthodox Judaism sentiment